Kunal Deshmukh is an Indian film director and restaurateur. He grew up in Mumbai, India.

Early life and education 

After finishing his schooling at Arya Vidya Mandir, Bandra, Mumbai and junior college at Jai Hind, Churchgate, he took up an advertising course at H.R. College. Later, he went to the US for a short diploma course on filmmaking. During that trip he also explored the NY dining scene with his friend Rikhey, which resulted in him eventually entering the hospitality industry.  He then met Mohit Suri through a common friend Sahil in Goa, who suggested that he join him in his next film, Zeher.

Career 

He started his career as an assistant director in Tumsa Nahin Dekha (2004), Zeher (2005), Kalyug and Woh Lamhe (2006), under director Mohit Suri and Vishesh Films.

In October 2006, he quit his job to work on a script. He made his directional debut Jannat in 2008, starring Emraan Hashmi, produced by Vishesh Films. Jannat was released in 2008 and was successful.

He made a film in 2009 Tum Mile, based on the 26 July 2005 Mumbai floods, starring Emraan Hashmi and Soha Ali Khan.

In 2012 Jannat 2, a sequel to Jannat was released and it got a huge success.

In 2009, he opened a fine dining restaurant named Trikaya at Bavdhan, Pune.

Filmography 

As Assistant Director

References

External links 

 
 Filmography Bollywood Hungama

Living people
Film directors from Mumbai
1982 births
Hindi-language film directors
21st-century Indian film directors
|}